Termux is a free and open source terminal emulator for Android which allows for running a Linux environment on an Android device. In addition, various software can be installed through the application's package manager.

Termux installs a minimal base system automatically; additional packages are available using its package manager.

Most commands available in Linux are accessible, as well as built-in Bash commands. There are also several other shells available, such as Zsh and tcsh.

Overview
Packages are cross-compiled with Android NDK and have compatibility patches to get them working on Android. Since all files are installed in the application directory, rooting is not required.

There are more than one thousand packages available, and users can submit requests for new ones.
Alternatively, packages can be compiled from source as Termux supports a variety of build tools including CMake, Meson, GNU Autotools, as well as compilers for C++, Rust, Go, Swift and several others.
Termux can also install interpreters for languages like Ruby, Python, JavaScript, etc.

Terminal-based text editors such as Emacs and Vim can be installed.

It is also possible to execute GUI applications in Termux by using a VNC server and installing a desktop environment (Xfce, LXQt, MATE) or window manager.

User interface 
Termux's user interface is fairly simple, only displaying the extra keys row and the terminal output. Color scheme and font can be changed through Termux:Styling.

The extra-keys row can also be customized. Users can add more function keys and controls by editing ~/.termux/termux.properties.

Termux has mouse/touch support which can be used to interact with programs such as htop and other ncurses-based applications. Scrolling is  done by swiping up or down in the terminal buffer.

Configuration 
Users configure Termux by editing ~/.termux/termux.properties.

Add-ons 

Termux also includes 7 add-ons:

 Termux:API: exposes Android functionality to CLI applications
 Termux:Styling: allows changing the color scheme and font of the terminal
 Termux:Boot: executes Termux commands at boot
 Termux:GUI: allows for some Termux apps to have a GUI using default Android resources; does not work with X11/Wayland apps
 Termux:Widget: lets users run scripts in a dedicated widget or a shortcut in the Home screen
 Termux:Float: runs terminal session in a floating window
 Termux:Tasker: integrates Tasker with Termux

Add-ons must be installed from the same source as the application, so that the same User ID is used.

History 
Termux was initially released in 2015. Support for requesting packages and features was added through GitHub issues in the app's repository. People can also contribute to the project by adding new features and packages.

In January 2020, the Termux development team ended support for devices running Android 5-6, making Android version 7 the minimum OS requirement.

With the policy changes in Google Play, updates to the app through Play Store are no longer possible; it is recommended to install the app from alternative sources.

As of 2021, Termux is maintained by the volunteer development team.

Installation 
The installation process extracts the bootstrap archive from the APK file, sets correct permissions for the executable, and sets up directories like the home directory.

Package management and distribution
Packages in Termux are installed through the application's package manager (pkg) and use the .deb format. However, normal Debian packages cannot be installed as Termux is not FHS compliant.
Users can also build and submit packages.

Package availability 
Termux has more than 1000 packages available as of 2021.

Package repositories 
Termux has 3 repositories available. Repositories included in the default Termux bootstrap installation include:

 main is the main repository containing all CLI utilities and other popular Linux tools and language compilers/interpreters.
 x11-repo contains X11-based packages and graphical applications.
 root-repo contains packages useful for rooted devices. Some of these packages can be used without root, but functionality may be limited.

Google Play updates 
Termux v0.101 was the last version to be updated in the Google Play Store. Since November 2020, Google Play has enforced apps targeting API level 29, which breaks the execution of binaries in private application directories. According to Google:Untrusted apps that target Android 10 cannot invoke exec() on files within the app's home directory. This execution of files from the writable app home directory is a W^X violation. Apps should load only the binary code that's embedded within an app's APK file. The Termux development team suggests moving to F-Droid in order to continue getting updates, as F-Droid does not impose such restrictions.

Bintray shutdown 
In May 2021, Bintray, which had been the primary host for the Termux packages, shut down their services. Termux migrated to another hosting service.

See also 
 Debian
 Command-line interface
 Package manager

References

External links 
 
 
 
 
 
 Termux wiki

Free and open-source Android software
Free terminal emulators